The Samoa women's national rugby sevens team represents Samoa in rugby sevens. Samoa competed in the 2011 Pacific Games and were runners-up after losing to Fiji. At the 2015 Pacific Games they defeated Tonga at the fifth place match.

History 
At the Oceania Women's Sevens Championship, Samoa placed second in 2007 and were fourth in 2008, 2013 and 2014. They competed at the 2020 Women's Rugby Sevens Final Olympic Qualification Tournament in Monaco but were unsuccessful to make it to the Tokyo Olympics.

Current squad

Previous squads

Tournament History

Pacific Games

References

 

Women's national rugby sevens teams
S
Rugby sevens